Epimactis melithorax is a moth in the family Lecithoceridae. It was described by Edward Meyrick in 1923. It is found in north-western India.

The wingspan is about 22 mm. The forewings are fuscous, with a faint purple tinge and with the costal edge yellow-ochreous. The hindwings are dark grey.

References

Moths described in 1923
Epimactis
Taxa named by Edward Meyrick